Phytoene desaturase (zeta-carotene-forming) (CrtIa, 2-step phytoene desaturase (ambiguous), two-step phytoene desaturase (ambiguous)) is an enzyme with systematic name 15-cis-phytoene:acceptor oxidoreductase (zeta-carotene-forming). This enzyme catalyses the following chemical reaction

 15-cis-phytoene + 2 acceptor  all-trans-zeta-carotene + 2 reduced acceptor (overall reaction)
 (1a) 15-cis-phytoene + acceptor  all-trans-phytofluene + reduced acceptor
 (1b) all-trans-phytofluene + acceptor  all-trans-zeta-carotene + reduced acceptor

The enzyme is involved in carotenoid biosynthesis.

See also 
 Phytoene desaturase (lycopene-forming)
 Phytoene desaturase (neurosporene-forming)
 15-Cis-phytoene desaturase
 Phytoene desaturase (3,4-didehydrolycopene-forming)

References

External links 
 

EC 1.3.99